Robinson Lake is a glacial tarn in the Ruby Mountains, in Elko County in the northeastern part of the state of Nevada. The lake is the source for Robinson Creek, which drops steeply to the east into Ruby Valley. Both were named for a family of early settlers in Ruby Valley.

Lakes of Elko County, Nevada
Ruby Mountains
Lakes of Nevada
Lakes of the Great Basin